J. Thomas McCarthy (born July 2, 1937 in Detroit, Michigan) is a Professor Emeritus at the University of San Francisco School of Law. He is the founding director of the McCarthy Institute for Intellectual Property and Technology Law. He has practiced, written, and taught in the field of trademarks and unfair competition and was a frequent speaker on the subject. McCarthy is a member of the California and U.S. Supreme Court bars and is admitted to practice before the United States Patent and Trademark Office.

Education 
He holds a degree in electrical engineering from the University of Detroit. He worked as an engineer for Chrysler Corporation Missile Division in the early days of the space program on the Redstone missile, a version of which was used to launch the Explorer I satellite in January 1958. He received a law degree from the University of Michigan Law School.

He is the son of John Edward McCarthy.

Legal Career 
For over twenty years until 2022, was an of counsel consultant with the law firm of Morrison & Foerster in its San Francisco office. He was a member of the A.L.I. Advisory Committee involved in drafting the 1995 Restatement of the Law of Unfair Competition and a member of the Trademark Review Commission, which drafted the 1989 revisions to the Lanham Act. He served for several years on the Editorial Board of The Trademark Reporter.

In 2010, American Lawyer listed McCarthy as one of the 25 most influential people in intellectual property, noting that "to say J. Thomas McCarthy wrote the book on trademark law is accurate wrote the book on trademark law is accurate, but something of an understatement."

Awards and lectures 
McCarthy has been the recipient of many significant awards during his career.

 The 2003 President's Award of the International Trademark Association
 The 2000 Pattishall Medal for excellence in teaching trademark law from the Brand Names Education Foundation
 The 1997 Ladas Professional Author Award from the Brand Names Education Foundation
 The 1997 Centennial Award in Trademark Law from the American Intellectual Property Law Association
 The 1994 Jefferson Medal from the New Jersey Intellectual Property Law Association
 The 1979 Rossman Award of the Patent and Trademark Office Society
 The 1965 Watson Award of the American Intellectual Property Law Association. 

In 2012, McCarthy was inducted into Intellectual Asset Management's Intellectual Property Hall of Fame. In 2018 he received a Lifetime Achievement Award from World Trademark Review magazine.

He has also delivered a number of significant lectures:

 The 1999 Niro Lecture at DePaul University College of Law
 The 1997 Tenzer Lecture at Cardozo Law School
 The 1995 H.S. Manges Lecture at Columbia University
 The 1989 Boal Memorial Lecture for the Brand Names Education Foundation

In 1994, he was the Biebel & French Distinguished Visiting Scholar in Law & Technology at the University of Dayton.

Publications 
McCarthy is the author of the seven volume treatise McCarthy on Trademarks and Unfair Competition, (5th edition Thomson Reuters) which has been relied upon as authority in over 7000 judicial opinions, including 16 opinions of the United States Supreme Court. The treatise was first published in 1973  in two volumes. Other books include the two-volume treatise The Rights of Publicity and Privacy (with Prof. Roger Schechter)   and McCarthy’s Desk Encyclopedia of Intellectual Property (Third Edition), (with Schechter & Franklyn).

References

External links 
 McCarthy Institute for Intellectual Property 

1937 births
Living people
University of San Francisco faculty
University of Dayton faculty
Lawyers from Detroit
University of Detroit Mercy alumni
University of Michigan Law School alumni
People associated with Morrison & Foerster